God Bless Satan is the debut album of ska band Mephiskapheles. It was released in 1994 on Moon Ska Records. The album has playful and satanic undertones.

Track listing 
 "Mephiskapheles" – 4:57
 "Satanic Debris" – 4:16
 "Bad John" – 3:24
 "Centre of the..." – 2:50
 "Hard Times" – 3:24
 "Doomsday" – 3:15
 "Rank & File" – 2:05
 "Eskamoes" – 4:01
 "Saba" – 5:59
 "The Ballad of Admiral Stockdale" – 2:40
 "Danse Me Not" – 4:01
 "Finnigan Froth" – 2:12
 "The Bumble Bee Tuna Song" – 5:29

References

1994 albums
Mephiskapheles albums